The Monster Walks is a 1932 American Pre-Code black-and-white horror film directed by Frank R. Strayer.

Plot
The film opens with Ruth Earlton and her fiancé Dr. Ted Carver arriving at her father's house. She has been told that her father has died, and is returning to find out what will be done with the estate. They arrive on a stormy night, and are greeted by her invalid uncle Robert, the housekeeper Mrs. Krug and the housekeeper's son Hanns.

While exploring the mansion, Ruth is dismayed to find a large ape her father used to conduct experiments in the basement. She and the others then gather to learn how the Earlton estate will be divided. Earlton has left his estate to Ruth, but it will go to her uncle Robert in the event of her death. Very small monthly sums are also left to the housekeeper Mrs. Krug and her son Hanns, and these two are very upset about the small amount of the allowance.

When Ruth goes to bed that night, a large, hairy hand reaches through the headboard and attempts to strangle her. When she screams, it disappears. Her fiancé and Mrs. Krug arrive at her room, and attempt to comfort her. Ted gives her a sleeping potion, and she falls asleep in a chair in her room while Mrs. Krug stays with her, taking the bed.

The hairy hand reappears through the headboard and strangles Mrs. Krug this time, killing her. Ruth awakens and alerts the rest of the household to what has happened. Afterward, Hanns Krug meets with Robert Earlton in secret, who tells him that their plan to kill Ruth Earlton has failed and Hanns has accidentally murdered his own mother. Hanns blames Robert for this, and after mentioning that Robert is actually his father, he strangles him as well, leaving him for dead.

Dr. Clayton visits Robert's room, and Robert regains consciousness. He tells Clayton about the plan he and Hanns had to murder Ruth, so that the estate would go to them instead. Clayton rushes out to find Ruth and warn her. She has already been taken by Hanns to the basement though, where he attempts to force the ape to kill her. The ape turns on him instead, killing him. Clayton arrives to find Ruth alive and well.

Cast

In credits order
Rex Lease as Dr Ted Clayton
Vera Reynolds as Ruth Earlton
Sheldon Lewis as Robert Earlton
Mischa Auer as Hanns Krug
Martha Mattox as Mrs. Emma Krug
Sidney Bracey as Herbert Wilkes
Sleep n' Eat as Exodus

Release
The Monster Walks was originally distributed by Mayfair Pictures. It was re-released in 1938 by Astor Pictures and once more in 1948 by Commonwealth Pictures.

Copyright status
This film is widely available, because its copyright has lapsed, placing it in the public domain in the United States and other countries.

See also
 List of films in the public domain in the United States

References

External links

1932 films
American monster movies
American black-and-white films
1932 horror films
American independent films
Films directed by Frank R. Strayer
Films set in country houses
Mayfair Pictures films
1930s English-language films
1930s American films